The Icelandic Coast Guard (or simply ) is the Icelandic defence service responsible for search and rescue, maritime safety and security surveillance, and law enforcement. The Coast Guard maintains the Iceland Air Defence System which conducts ground-based surveillance of Iceland's air space and operate Keflavik airbase. It is also responsible for hydrographic surveying and nautical charting.

History
Its origins can be traced to 1859, when the corvette Ørnen started patrolling Icelandic waters. In 1906, Iceland's first purposely built guard-ship, Islands Falk, began operation. Iceland's own defense of its territorial waters began around 1920 and the Icelandic Coast Guard was formally founded on 1 July 1926. The first cannon was put on the trawler Þór in 1924 and on 23 June 1926 the first ship built for the Coast Guard, named Óðinn, arrived in Iceland. Three years later, on 14 July 1929 the coastal defence ship Ægir was added to the Coast Guard fleet.

Cod Wars 
The Icelandic Coast Guard played its largest role during the  fishing rights dispute known as the Cod Wars, between 1972 and 1976, when the Coast Guard ships would cut the trawl wires of British and West German trawlers, resulting in confrontations with Royal Navy warships and tugs from the British Ministry of Agriculture, Fisheries and Food (MAFF). The Icelandic Coast Guard goal was to enforce a disputed expansion of Iceland's exclusive economic zone. Engagements between Icelandic gunboats and British warships involving ramming became the tactic of choice during this conflict. At least 15 British frigates, five Icelandic patrol boats and one British supply ship were damaged by ramming between 1975 and 1976.

Operations

The Icelandic Coast Guard's (ICG) primary mission as stipulated in Section 1 of Act on Icelandic Coast Guard is conduct search and rescue, maritime safety and security surveillance, and law enforcement inside the -wide economic zone. The Coast Guard operates Joint Rescue and Coordination Centre (JRCC) Iceland which is responsible for search and rescue of vessels and aircraft in Iceland's search and rescue region (SRR) according to International Aeronautical and Maritime Search and Rescue (IAMSAR) Manual. Additionally the ICG is in the charge of defusing naval mines, most of which were laid during the Second World War, and monitoring fisheries in international waters outside of the Icelandic economic zone in order to blacklist any vessel partaking in unregulated fishing and thus bar them from receiving services from any member of the North East Atlantic Fisheries Commission in order to make unregulated fishing unprofitable. The Icelandic Coast Guard also occasionally operates within Greenlandic and Faeroese waters, following a bilateral agreement with Denmark regarding mutual aid in security, rescue and defence matters.

The Coast Guard accomplishes these tasks with the use of offshore patrol vessels (OPV), helicopters, surveillance aircraft, satellites and a network of land based surface scanning radar.

The Icelandic Coast Guard is also in charge of the Iceland Air Defence System, which operates four ground-based AN-FPS(V)5 air surveillance radars and a control and command centre.

In the 1990s the Coast Guard started hosting exercises such as "Northern Challenge" which had military units from Norway, Denmark, Sweden and the United Kingdom, among others, participating along with the Icelandic Coast Guard. The Coast Guard has also taken part in peacekeeping operations on behalf of the Icelandic Crisis Response Unit, although while usually using their own rank insignia, uniforms and weapons.

The fleet also takes part in Frontex operations, and in that role  played a major part in the rescue of over 300 Syrian refugees in the eastern Mediterranean Sea in January 2015.

Fleet
, the Icelandic Coast Guard fleet consists of two OPVs, one coastal hydrographic and patrol vessel and an independent fast rigid-hulled inflatable boat (RHIB), as well as numerous smaller boats assigned to the larger units. In 2011 the Coast Guard received ICGV Þór , built by the Asmar shipyard in Talcahuano, Chile.

, lead ship of the Ægir class, is ICGV Týrs sister ship, built by Ålborg Værft a/s and launched in 1968. Each ship is equipped with two or more RHIBs of various sizes and armed with a 40 mm Bofors cannon. Various kinds of small arms as well as other man-portable weapons are also carried on board each of the ships. Týr and Þór are also equipped with sonar systems and the Ægir-class vessels have flight decks and a hangar for a small helicopter. While the Coast Guard doesn't operate small enough helicopters to use the hangars, the flight decks are often used by the helicopters of the Aeronautical Division on various missions.

The coastguard has as well a 73-ton patrol and hydrographic survey vessel, named Baldur, built by Vélsmiðja Seyðisfjarðar shipyard in 1991. This vessel has no mounted weaponry but it has nonetheless been used for port security and fishery inspection.

The newest ship of the fleet, was bought in September 2021 to replace the 46-year old ICGV Týr. It arrived for retrofit at Damen Shiprepair Rotterdam in Schiedam on 11 October and was formally delivered to the Coast Guard on 1 November 2021. She departed for Siglufjordur on 2 November.

Aeronautical division
After World War II, the Coast Guard occasionally leased civilian aircraft for short term monitoring of shipping and fishing in the territorial waters, first in 1948 when a Grumman Goose was leased from Loftleiðir. On 10 December 1955, the Coast Guard acquired its first aircraft when a Consolidated PBY-6A Catalina flying boat was acquired from the Civil Aviation Administration. It was originally from the Iceland Defense Force but was damaged near Langanes in 1954. It was named Rán and registered as TF-RAN.

In 1972, the ICG, along with the National Life-saving Association of Iceland, bought its first specialized search and rescue helicopter, a Sikorsky S-62 that was named Gná, from the United States Coast Guard. Three years later, Gná crashed in Skálafell, with no injuries, after a shaft in the tail propeller broke.

It took five years for another SAR helicopter to arrive but in 1980, the Coast Guard bought a new Sikorsky S-76 which was given the name Rán. The helicopter performed admirably, including in March 1983, when Rán, along with a French Aérospatiale SA 330 Puma, one of two temporarily deployed in the country, rescued 11 people from Hafrún ÍS-400 after it ran aground at Stigahlíð in the Westfjords. However, in November 1983, Rán crashed in Jökulfirðir in the Westfjords of Iceland during a training mission, killing its four man crew, in what remains the deadliest accident in the ICG history. The loss of Rán and some of the Coast Guard's most experienced flight members nearly caused the shutdown of its helicopter program. After some deliberation, the decision was made in 1984 to continue the program and buy a new Aérospatiale SA 365N Dauphin II and rent another until the new one would arrive.

In 1985, the new Sif arrived and with it, several changes where made to the helicopter program, including to training, expanding crew rosters, addition of helicopter doctors and shift plans to expand its availability. Sif went on to become one of the ICG most successful aircraft to date. During its 22-year career it took part in several high profile rescue operations around Iceland and is credited to have been involved in the rescue of around 250 lives.

In 1995, the ICG received a second specialised SAR helicopter when it bought an Aérospatiale AS-332L1 Super Puma which was given the name Líf. The new helicopter continued on the success of Sif and gained national fame when it rescued 39 sailors in three separate incidents during a six-day period in March 1997.

As a response to the withdrawal of the Iceland Defense Force in 2006, the Coast Guard expanded its helicopters to four in 2007. That number was later reduced to three and as of 2022, it operates three Airbus Helicopters H225 helicopters named Gná, Gróa and Eir.

The Coast Guard also operates a single Bombardier DHC-8-Q314, registered as TF-SIF, modified for maritime surveillance and reconnaissance. This plane has been extensively modified by FIELD to carry a modern Mission Management System and suite of surveillance sensors, air operable door and communications/navigation equipment. It is occasionally also used for surveillance of volcanic eruptions, such as the 2010 eruptions of Eyjafjallajökull.

Vehicles
All major vehicles of the Icelandic Coast Guard are named after beings from Norse mythology.

Vessels

Decommissioned vessels

In addition the Coast Guard has rented or borrowed a number of civilian vessels and aircraft for shorter periods, which are not listed.

Aircraft

Retired
Previous notable aircraft operated consisted of the Consolidated PBY Catalina, Douglas C-54, Fokker F27, Bell 47J/G, MD 500C, Sikorsky S-62, Sikorsky S-76, Eurocopter AS365, Eurocopter AS350

Radars 

The Iceland Air Defense System monitors Iceland's airspace. Air Defense is provided by fighter jets from NATO allies, which rotate units for the Icelandic Air Policing mission to Keflavik Air Base.
The Iceland Air Defense System's Control and Reporting Centre is at Keflavik Air Base and reports to NATO's Integrated Air Defense System CAOC Uedem in Germany.

 Iceland Air Defense System, at Keflavik Air Base
 Control and Reporting Centre, at Keflavik Air Base
 H1 Radar Station, at Miðnesheiði, with AN/FPS-117(V)5
 H2 Radar Station, on Mount Gunnolfsvík, with AN/FPS-117(V)5
 H3 Radar Station, at Stokksnes, with AN/FPS-117(V)5
 H4 Radar Station, on Bolafjall, with AN/FPS-117(V)5

Weaponry
The Icelandic Coast Guard possesses over 200 firearms, with more than half of them in storage. In 2014, the Coast Guard received 250 Heckler & Koch MP5 from the Norwegian Armed Forces. The acquisition of the weapons caused an uproar in Iceland due to several facts, including that the mostly unarmed Icelandic Police was to receive 150 of them and conflicting statements from Icelandic and Norwegian officials on whether they were a gift or bought.
In June 2015, the weapons were returned to Norway.

Currently in use

Currently in storage

Ranks

Officers

Enlisted

See also
Military of Iceland
Iceland Defense Force (United States Armed Forces in Iceland)

References

External links

Official Site in English
Landhelgisgæsla Íslands in Icelandic.
Coast Guard laws in Icelandic.
Info on Icelandic Coast Guard
Randburg discussion on Icelandic Coast Guard
Ranks of the Icelandic Coast Guard

 
1926 establishments in Iceland
Military history of Iceland
Transport in Iceland
Coast Guard
Coast guards
National hydrographic offices